Frank Howard Lahey MD (June 1, 1880, Haverhill, Massachusetts – June 17, 1953, Boston, Massachusetts), was a physician who founded the Lahey Clinic in Boston in 1923. Lahey was nationally known in the U.S. medical profession, not only as a world-renowned surgeon, but also as a  teacher of medicine, and a medical administrator.

Education, career, and founding of Lahey Clinic
"Usually referred to as the outstanding general surgeon in the world today, at times of crisis he was never known to lose either his head or his nerve," stated the Boston Globe in 1953. "First and foremost he never allowed himself or his assistants to forget they had a human life in their hands. Surely but for him, thousands would not be alive today."

Although he prided himself on being a general surgeon, Lahey was well known for his expertise in thyroid and esophageal surgery, and surgery for stomach cancer and colon cancer. The "two-stage surgery" that he pioneered, in which surgery was completed in two steps over a period of two to four days, greatly improved surgical outcomes. In fact, his method decreased the mortality rate following thyroid surgery from 1-in-5 to 1-in-140.

Like his father—who was a granite cutter by trade and eventually became a wealthy bridge contractor—Lahey built his career from humble beginnings.

Lahey attended high school in his hometown of Haverhill, Massachusetts, where he had his own newspaper route and worked at his father's firm. He then went on to attend Harvard Medical School, where he received a medical degree in 1904. After he served as intern and house surgeon at Long Island Hospital (1904-1905) and as a surgeon at Boston City Hospital (1905-1907), Lahey became resident surgeon of the Haymarket Relief Station (1908). He was on the surgical faculty of Harvard Medical School (1908-1909 and 1912-1915), and served as professor of surgery at Tufts University Medical School (1913-1917).

Because of his educational influence, Lahey is often regarded as one of America's greatest teachers of surgery. In 1953, gastroenterologist Sara Jordan, one of the first to join Lahey's practice, published an article in New England Journal of Medicine that noted: "His skill [brought] hundreds of surgeons from all parts of the world to see him operate and to share with him the knowledge and experience he was always ready to pass on to others."

During World War I, Lahey served as a major in the Army Medical Corps and director of surgery at Evacuation Hospital No. 30. After his return from military service, he opened a small practice on Beacon Street in Kenmore Square in Boston that became the Lahey Clinic in 1923.

President Franklin D. Roosevelt appointed Lahey to serve on a special commission to report on medical standards during World War II. This, and his extensive experience as a military surgeon, that strengthened Lahey's belief that anesthesia had created a new kind of surgery, which was best performed and refined by teams of surgical specialists.

Lahey held many influential leadership positions, including president of the American Medical Association, New England Surgical Society, American College of Surgeons, and the International Society of Surgeons. He also operated on, or consulted with, many notables in his lifetime, including President Anastasio Somoza García of Nicaragua, and Anthony Eden of Great Britain.

In 1946, Lahey was awarded the Henry Jacob Bigelow Medal of the Boston Surgical Society in recognition of his surgical achievements.

The life of Frank Lahey was summed up in a speech now in the United States Congressional Record. When the House of Representatives met shortly after his death on June 27, 1953, a memorial speech was delivered in his honor and concludes: "The medical profession has lost one of its greatest members. Massachusetts has lost a citizen who accepted with enthusiasm the broader responsibilities of his profession. The world has lost a man who was unequaled in his services to mankind."

Consultation with President Franklin D. Roosevelt
In March 1944, Lahey was called to the White House to see President Franklin D. Roosevelt. Lahey ultimately advised Roosevelt not to seek a fourth term, since Roosevelt was suffering with serious illnesses, possibly including cancer and advanced heart disease, expressing serious doubt that Roosevelt could survive another four years in office. Lahey later agreed to suppress his report due to national security issues during wartime.

Roosevelt died in April 1945, of what his attending physician said was a cerebral hemorrhage. Lahey's report on Roosevelt's illness was finally published many years after his death.

References

Bibliography
Harry S. Goldsmith MD, A Conspiracy of Silence: The Health and Death of Franklin D. Roosevelt (IUniverse, 2007)

External links
Lahey Clinic official website

1880 births
1953 deaths
American surgeons
Harvard Medical School alumni
20th-century surgeons
Presidents of the American Medical Association